Amshey Markovich Nurenberg (April 17, 1887 – 10 January 1979) was a Ukrainian painter, adherent of the School of Paris, graphic artist, art critic, and memoirist.

Born in Elisavetgrad, in 1904–1910 Nurenberg studied in the Odessa School of Arts with Professor Cyriaque Costandi. After having graduated from the School he continued his education in Paris. He lived in the Latin Quarter with other artists from Russia and during a year shared an atelier with M.Chagall in the phalanstery La Ruche.

In 1913 he returned to Odessa, where headed the group of modernists "The Independent", founded the private school "Free Studio" (1918), and participated in exhibitions of Odessa artists. After the Russian Revolution (1917) he was appointed to the People's Commissar of Arts of Odessa and to the head of the Committee for Protecting the Artistic and Historic Heritage.

Since 1920 he lived in Moscow, where was the first art columnist of the newspaper Pravda, worked in the ROSTA Windows together with Vladimir Mayakovsky, and was professor of history of the Western art at the VKhUTEMAS. In 1927–29 he was missioned to Paris by the People's Commissar for Education A. Lunacharsky to read lectures on new Soviet arts. In 1932 he has contributed to the organization of the Moscow Regional Union of Soviet Artists (МОССХ) which later has been extended to the USSR Union of Artists.

During World War II Nurenberg was in the evacuation in Tashkent (Uzbekistan). He continued to work as a painter and finished a series of anti-war paintings. After the war he has continued to work as an artist in Moscow, in particular for the Museum of Revolution.

During his life, Nurenberg has worked in different styles—from avant-garde to realism, having always remained faithful to traditions of the School of Paris.

Family

Wife: ballerina and artist Polina Mamichava Полина Николаевна Мамичева (1894–1978). Daughter: opera singer Nina Nelina (born Nurenberg) coloratura soprano, soloist of the Bolshoi Theater from 1946 to 1957 (Нина Нелина, 1923–1966) and wife of the writer Yury Trifonov; their daughter (granddaughter of A. Nurenberg): Dr. Olga Tangian Ольга Юрьевна Тангян (born Trifonova in 1951). One of brothers: the artist David Devinov Давид Девинов (Давид Маркович Нюренберг, 1896–1964).

Biography
April 21, 1887, birth in Elisavetgrad (now Kropyvnytskyi), Ukraine, in a Jewish family. Parents were fishmongers. Amshey was the eldest of 10 children.

1905 graduate from the Elisavetgrad high school, where the arts were taught by Ilya Repin's apprentice Feodosiy Kozachinsky

1905–11 studies at the Odessa School of Arts in the class of Professor Cyriaque Costandi

1911–13 stay in Paris, studies in private Academies of Arts, work as an art reporter for a newspaper in Russian "Paris Bulletin" (Парижский вестник). Share of an atelier with M.Chagall in the phalanstery La Ruche in the Passage de Dantzig

1913 return to Elisavetgrad, teaching activities

1915 move to Odessa, joint exhibitions with a group of modernists called later «Odessa Parisians». Organisation of the "Society of the Independent" transformed in 1918 into the "Association of Independent Artists"

1915 marriage with a ballerina Polina Mamichava (1894–1978)

1918 foundation of the "Free Studio" together with the "Children Academy". Teachers were the artists who studied in France (Amshey Nurenberg, Sigismund Olesevich, Alex (Sandro) Fasini, Theophil Freiermann, Isaak Malik). Among Nurenberg learners were Victor Midler (later the senior curator of the Department of the modern Russian art of the Tretjykov Gallery), wife Polina Mamicheva, and Naum Sobol (stage designer)

1919 People's Commissar of Arts of Odessa and the head of the Committee for Protecting the Artistic and Historic Heritage

1919–20 editor-in-chief of the first Soviet newspaper in Elisavetgrad "Red village" (Красная деревня)

1920 move to Moscow, work in the ROSTA Windows together with Vladimir Mayakovsky, Ivan Maljutin, and Mikhail Cheremnych; making over 200 posters

1921 organisation of the New Society of Painting (НОЖ) together with artists Alexander Gluskin, Samuel Adlivankin, Georgy Ryazhskiy, Mikhail Perutskiy, and others; writing the manifesto of the society

1921–22 mission to Uzbekistan together with Victor Midler and Polina Mamicheva for organisation of restoration of cultural and historic monuments

1922–24 professor of history of the Western art at the VKhUTEMAS

1923 birth of the daughter Nina (soloist of the Bolshoi Theater under the stage name Nina Nelina)

1923–25 joint exhibitions with the former members of the group Jack of Diamonds (1910–17) and writing the art manifesto for their new society Moscow Painters under the chairmanship of Pyotr Konchalovsky

1924–26 first arts columnist of the newspaper Pravda

1927–29 Mission to Paris by the People's Commissar of Education Anatoly Lunacharsky as "cultural ambassador" for lecturing on new Soviet arts and writing surveys on French arts for the Soviet press. Participation in the Paris Salon d'automne 1928

1930s contribution to the organisation of the Moscow Regional Union of Soviet Artists (МОССХ), work for the Museum of Revolution, trips to gather material for creative work to kolkhoz's of Ukraine and North-Caucasus and to coal-fields of Kuzbas

1941–43 evacuation to Tashkent during World War II. Work at the Uzbek Union of Soviet Artists

1943 return to Moscow. Work for the Museum of Revolution

1950s retirement. Continuation of active artistic and literary work, including participation in exhibitions, writing memoirs, and publications in newspapers and journals

January 10, 1979, death at the age of 91 in Moscow. Burial at the Vagankov cemetery.

Works in museums

 Moscow, State Tretyakov Gallery: 67 works, including paintings Bourgeois Swines (1929–30), Supper (1930), Socialist contract (1931)
 Moscow, State Pushkin Museum of Fine Arts: 45 works
 Moscow, Mayakovsky Museum: 14 works, portraits of Mayakovsky of different years
 Moscow, State Museum of the East Nations Art: 69 works, Asia works of 1920s and 1940s
 Moscow, State Central Museum of Modern History of Russia (former Museum of Revolution): portraits of Lenin, revolution and antimilitary works
 Moscow, Central Armed Forces Museum (former Museum of Red Army): painting Happy Youth (1936)
 Kiev, National Art Museum of Ukraine: 39 works
 Kirovograd (Ukraine), Regional Art Museum: 102 works
 Nukus (Uzbekistan), State Art Museum of the Republic of Karakalpakstan named after I. V. Savitsky: about 60 works
 Ramat Gan (Israel), about 20 works
 Minneapolis (USA), The Museum of Russian Art (TMORA): 15 works

Exhibitions

 1908, Odessa. Exhibition of the Association of South-Russian Artists (ТЮРХ)
 1913, Jelisavetgrad. First Jelisavetgrad Art Exhibition
 1916, Odessa. Exhibition of the Society of the Independent
 1918, Odessa. Exhibition of the Association of Independent Artists
 1919, Odessa. First People's Exhibition
 1920, Odessa. Exhibition in Memory of T.Shevchenko
 1922, Moscow. Exhibition of the New Society of Painting (НОЖ)
 1924, Moscow. Joint exhibition of drawings and water-colours with Robert Falk and Alexander Shevchenko at the State Tsvetkov Art Gallery
 1927, Paris. Salon d'automne
 1929, Moscow. Exhibition «ROSTA Satiric Windows» at the State Tretyakov Gallery
 1932, Venice. Bienale 
 1939, Moscow. Industry of Socialism
 1945, Moscow. Personal exhibition at the Central House of Writers (ZDL)
 1961, Moscow. Personal exhibition at the Moscow Department of the Union of Artiststs of the RSFSR (МОСХ РСФСР)
 1963, Odessa. Personal exhibition
 1979, Moscow. Posthumous personal exhibition at the Moscow Department of the Organisation of the Union of Artists of the RSFSR (МОСХ , Беговая ул. 7-9)
 1988, Moscow. Exhibition of the Nukus Art Museum at the State Museum of the East Nations Art (currently State Museum of Oriental Art)
 2004, Moscow. Exhibition of Brothers Amshey Nurenberg and David Devinov-Nurenberg at the gallery «Kovcheg»
 2006, Ramat Gan (Israel). Exhibition «Odesa Parisians» at the Maria & Michael Zetlin Museum of Russian Art
 2009, Kirovohrad (since 2016 Kropyvnytskyi), Ukraine. Personal exhibition at the [Kirovohrad Regional Art Museum https://usefultravelarticles.com/6739-kirovograd-regional-art-museum-description-and-photo-ukraine-kirovograd.html]
 2009, Odesa. Personal exhibition at the  World Club of Odessians
 2010, Kyiv. Exhibition of works of the Society of Independent Artists from the collection of Jacob Peremen at the Bohdan and Varvara Khanenko National Museum of Arts
 2011, New York. Exhibition «Ukrainian Avant-Garde: Odesa Parisians» at the National Arts Club.
 2013, Kyiv. Exhibition "Society of the Independent" at the National Art Museum of Ukraine
 2014, Odesa. Exhibition "They are back!" at the Museum of Odesa modern art
 2020, Moscow. Personal Exhibition of works of Nurenberg at the State Museum of Oriental Art
 2021, Moscow. Exhibition "Give Kuzbass! To the 300th anniversary of Kuzbass" (Russian: "Даешь Кузбасс! К 300-летию Кузбасса") at the State Tretyakov Gallery
 2021, Kemerovo. Exhibition "Building Kuzbass, building the country!" (Russian: "Строим Кузбасс, строим страну!") at the Kemerovo Regional Museum of Fine Arts
2021, Odesa. Exhibition "Yesterday, today, always" at the Museum of Odesa modern art

Membership in artistic unions
 1910, Odessa. Association of South-Russian Artists (ТЮРХ)
 1915–18, Odessa. Society of the Independent
 1918–19, Odessa. Association of Independent Artists
 1921–22, Моscow. New Society of Painting (НОЖ)
 1926–27, Моscow. Association of artists of the revolutionary Russia (АХРР)
 1932–79, Моscow. Moscow Regional Union of Soviet Artists (МОССХ), later renamed into Moscow Union of Soviet Artists (МССХ), Moscow Department of the Union of Artiststs of the RSFSR (МОСХ РСФСР), and Moscow Department of the Organisation of the Union of Artists of the RSFSR (МОСХ)

Books (Russian)
 V. Midler and A. Nurenberg (1922) Samarkand and Tashkent. Moscow - Tashkent, Risolya (Russian)
 A. Nurenberg (1924) Paul Cézanne. Moscow, VKhUTEMAS
 A. Nurenberg (1969). Reminiscences, acquaintances, thoughts about arts. Moscow, Soviet Artist
 A. Nuerenberg (2010) Odessa — Paris — Moscow. Memoirs of an artist. Editing and introductory article by O. Tangian. Concluding article by L. Voiskoun. Moscow, Gesharim (Russian)

Notes

Sources
 A. Nurenberg (1969). Reminiscences, acquaintances, thoughts about arts. Moscow, Soviet Artist
 A. Nurenberg (1994). Stories of an old artist. Time and ourselves (New York - Moscow), No. 124, 225–261, and No. 126, 216–259
 Odessa Parisians. Works of artists-modernists from the collection of Jacob Peremen (2006). Museum of Russian Art, Ramat-Gan, and publisher "Cultural bridges", Moscow (Одесские парижане. Произведения художников-модернистов из коллекции Якова Перемена (2006). Музей русского искусства, Рамат-Ган, и издательство "Мосты культуры", Москва. 2006)
 A.Nurenberg (2007). Odessa - Paris - Moscow. Reminiscences of an artist. Deribasovskaya - Rishelyevskaya. Odessa Anthology, Book 30, 208-225. (А. М. Нюренберг (2007). Одесса - Париж - Москва. Воспоминания художника. Дерибасовская - Ришельевская. Одесский альманах. Книга 30, стр. 208 - 225
 A. Nuerenberg (2010) Odessa — Paris — Moscow. Memoires of an artist. Editing and introductory article by O. Tangian. Concluding article by L. Voiskoun. Moscow, Mosty cultury - Gesharim (Russian)
 Amshey Nurenberg, about him (2008). Maslovka - Residence of Artists
 O. Tangian (2009). "Odessa Parisan" A.Nurenberg. Deribasovskaya - Rishelyevskaya. Odessa Anthology, Book 37, 182–206 (О. Тангян (2009). "Одесский парижанин" А.Нюренберг. Дерибасовская - Ришельевская. Одесский альманах. Книга 37, стр. 182 - 206)

External links
 Amshey Nurenberg homepage/virtual museum (English and Russian)
 Pictures and biography of Nurenberg from "Maslovka - Residence of Artists" (Russian)

1887 births
1979 deaths
Artists from Kropyvnytskyi
Ukrainian Jews
Soviet artists
Academic staff of Vkhutemas
Burials at Vagankovo Cemetery